Sasura Ghara Zindabad is a 2010 Oriya film written directed by Sanjay Nayak. The film revolves around the three sons-in-law. The film achieved the rare distinction of entering the Limca Book of Records for having approval of censorship as one of two films by the same producer, director, cinematographer and hero, along with the film Dil Tate Deichi on the same day.

Plot
The story is about three sons-in-law. The youngest of them is Raja, played by Sabyasachi Mishra. The middle son-in-law is Hadu Patnaik, while the eldest of them being Arvind. These three marry to the daughters of the rich industrialist Biren Mishra. The three heroines are Mayuri, Deepali and Megha. The father-in-law has two wives, played respectively by Puspa Panda and Snigdha Mohanty. Apparently, the eldest two of the sons-in-law are living off the property of their father in law, sitting idle. When the third son-in-law arrives in the scene, who is a petty thief, he quickly changes the situation.

Cast
Sabyasachi Misra as Raja
Megha Ghosh as Preeti
Hadu Patnaik
Arabinda		
Deepali		
Mayuri		
Minaketan		
Biran Misra		
Bijay Mohanty		
Pushpa Panda		
Tandra Roy		
Jairam Samal

Music
The music of the film composed  by Abhijit Majumdar. The tracks from the film include:

Awards and nominations

 Nomination for Best  Actor Sabyasachi Mishra in 2nd Etv Oriya Film Awards 2011
 Nomination for Best  Comedian Hadu Patnaik in 2nd Etv Oriya Film Awards 2011
 Nomination for Best  Comedian Arabinda in 2nd Etv Oriya Film Awards 2011
 Nomination for Best  Playback singer Bibhu Kishor in 2nd Etv Oriya Film Awards 2011

References

External links 
 

2010 films
2010s Odia-language films